Marcantonio Dal Re (18 December 1697 – 26 April 1766), also spelled Marc'Antonio Dal Re, was an Italian engraver and publisher. He is known for his engravings of buildings and vedute of Lombardy. Among his most splendid prints is a depiction of the interior of the Regio Ducal Teatro in Milan, which serves as an extravagant frame for a sonnet in praise of the soprano Violante Vestri.

References

1697 births
1766 deaths
Italian engravers
Place of birth missing